Crazy Days may refer to:

 "Crazy Days" (song), a 2008 song by Adam Gregory
 Crazy Days (album), a 2009 album by Adam Gregory
 Crazy Days (film), a 1977 Croatian film